This is a list of the extreme points of Afghanistan.

Cardinal directions

Elevation
Noshaq is the highest point in Afghanistan.

Lowest point in Afghanistan (about 255 m above sea level): The area in the northern end of Khamyab District where the Amu Darya  flows into Turkmenistan.

See also 

Geography of Afghanistan
Extreme points of Asia

Notes

References 

Geography of Afghanistan
Afghanistan